is a Prefectural Natural Park in central Yamaguchi Prefecture, Japan. Established in 1962, the park spans the borders of the municipalities of Hagi and Yamaguchi.

See also
 National Parks of Japan

References

Parks and gardens in Yamaguchi Prefecture
Hagi, Yamaguchi
Yamaguchi (city)
Protected areas established in 1962
1962 establishments in Japan